Jean-Claude Meunier (7 December 1950 – 9 December 1985) was a French cyclist. He competed in the team time trial at the 1972 Summer Olympics.

References

External links
 

1950 births
1985 deaths
French male cyclists
Olympic cyclists of France
Cyclists at the 1972 Summer Olympics
People from Vierzon
Sportspeople from Cher (department)
Cyclists from Centre-Val de Loire
20th-century French people